Deer Harbor Sea Plane Base   is a seaplane base located in Deer Harbor, Washington on Orcas Island.

Airlines and destinations

Passenger

References

External links 

Airports in Washington (state)
Airports in San Juan County, Washington
Seaplane bases in the United States